The Bald Mountains are a mountain range rising along the border between Tennessee and North Carolina in the southeastern United States.  They are part of the Blue Ridge Mountain Province of the Southern Appalachian Mountains.  The Bald Mountains stretch from the Pigeon River in the south to the Nolichucky River in the north, and comprise parts of Cocke County, Greene County, and Unicoi County in Tennessee and parts of Madison County and Yancey County in North Carolina.  The Great Smoky Mountains border the range to the south, and the Unakas rise opposite the Nolichucky to the north.  The range gets its name from the relatively frequent occurrence of grassy balds atop the more prominent summits.

The Cherokee National Forest and the Pisgah National Forest protect substantial sections of the Bald Mountains. The Appalachian Trail traverses the crest of the range. Populated areas within the range include Erwin and Del Rio in Tennessee and Hot Springs in North Carolina.

See also
 Max Patch

References

External links

 
 Big Bald Banding Station — An annual migratory bird banding and monitoring project that operates atop Big Bald

Mountain ranges of North Carolina
Mountain ranges of Tennessee
Blue Ridge Mountains
Mountains of Cocke County, Tennessee
Landforms of Greene County, Tennessee
Landforms of Unicoi County, Tennessee
Landforms of Madison County, North Carolina
Mountains of Yancey County, North Carolina
Cherokee National Forest
Pisgah National Forest
Mountains on the Appalachian Trail